Jeffrey John Benton (born 9 October 1953) is an Australian cricketer. He played four first-class and four List A matches for South Australia between 1977 and 1985. His son, Nick, also plays first-class cricket.

See also
 List of South Australian representative cricketers

References

External links
 

1953 births
Living people
Australian cricketers
South Australia cricketers
People from Mildura